Clubul Sportiv Municipal Slatina, commonly known as CSM Slatina, is a women's handball club from Slatina, Romania, that plays in the Liga Națională.

Kits

Honours

Domestic competitions
 Divizia A
 Winners: 2016–17

Players

Current squad

Goalkeepers
 1  Viktoriya Timoshenkova
 12  Andreea Chetraru 
 16  Elena Nagy

Wingers
Left Wings
 96  Hermina Stoicănescu

Right Wings
 34  Andreea Coman 

Line players
 9  Elena Fulgoi
 13  Teodora Popescu 
 21  Florentina Craiu

Backs
Left Backs  
 2  Diana Lixăndroiu
 8  Andreea Pătuleanu-Bogdanovici
 10  Sonia Vasiliu
 22  Sabrina Lazea
 98  Mara Matea

Centre Backs   
 6  Geanina Drăghici
 17  Rebeca Necula     

Right Backs    
 3  Adina Cârligeanu
 11  Valentina Lecu
 20  Nataliia Striukova
 29  Adriana Țăcălie

Transfers
Transfers for the 2023–24 season

 Joining
  Jovana Sazdovska (LW) (from  HC Dunărea Brăila) (?)
  Yevgenia Levchenko (RW) (from  SCM Râmnicu Vâlcea) (?)

 Leaving
  Rebeca Necula (CB) (to  SCM Râmnicu Vâlcea)

References

External links
   
 

Romanian handball clubs
Sport in Slatina, Romania
Liga Națională (women's handball) clubs
Handball clubs established in 2009
2009 establishments in Romania